Thomas Cole Mountain is a mountain in Greene County, New York. The mountain is named after the artist Thomas Cole (1801–1848), who lived in the area and is regarded as the founder of the Hudson River School.

Thomas Cole Mountain is part of the Blackhead range, and is the fourth highest peak of the broader Catskill Mountains. Thomas Cole is flanked to the east by Black Dome, and to the west by Camel's Hump.

Thomas Cole Mountain stands within the watershed of Schoharie Creek, which drains into the Mohawk River, the Hudson River, and into New York Bay.
The south side of Thomas Cole drains into East Kill, and thence into Schoharie Creek.
The north side of Thomas Cole drains into Batavia Kill, and thence into Schoharie Creek.

Thomas Cole Mountain is within New York's Catskill Park.

Notes

See also 
 List of mountains in New York
 Catskill High Peaks
 Catskill Mountain 3500 Club

External links 
 Thomas Cole Mountain Hiking Information Catskill 3500 Club
  Peakbagger.com: Thomas Cole Mountain
  Summitpost.org: Thomas Cole
 

Mountains of Greene County, New York
Catskill High Peaks
Mountains of New York (state)